Mount Adelung is the highest peak in Pskem Range in the extreme north-east of the Tashkent Region, Uzbekistan. Mount Adelung is the highest point of Tashkent Province at 4,301 meters, just 2 meters higher than the nearby Mount Beshtor, located a little further to the south-west in the same range, and it is often erroneously identified in various web sources as the "highest point in Uzbekistan". In fact, this honor goes to the Khazret Sultan, a peak with an altitude of 4,643 m in Surxondaryo Region, in the Uzbek part of the Gissar Range, on the border with Tajikistan, which was formerly known as Peak of the 22nd Congress of the Communist Party.

Some web sources use the name Adelunga Toghi, where Adelunga corresponds to the Russian possessive form of Adelung and Toghi presumably stands for mountain in the Uzbek language (tog’ in Latin script, тоғ in Cyrillic script). It is not known at this stage of writing which Adelung the mountain is named after.

References

Adelung
Four-thousanders of the Tian Shan